Tikri is a mid-sized village located in the NH 248A Sohna Road Sector 48 in the Gurgaon district of the Indian state of Haryana. It has a population of about 1100 people living in around 500 households. There are mostly 'Yadav' Community.  Its pin code is 122101. It comes in Municipal Corporation Gurgaon.

References 

Villages in Gurgaon district